Shine is the first EP released by Brazilian singer Daniel Peixoto and was released on June, 2011, by French label AbatJour Records. Peixoto was chosen "Artist of the Week" in voting of MTV IGGY from New York City.

The single "Eu Só Paro Se Cair"  peaked at number ten on the German Airplay Chart. "Shine" became single on February 16, 2013 with a videoclip shot in the tropical beaches of Fortaleza.

Track listing

References 

2011 EPs
Daniel Peixoto albums